An Ellis Island Special is a family name that is perceived or labeled, incorrectly, as having been altered or anglicized by immigration officials at the Ellis Island immigration station when a family reached the United States, typically from Europe in the 19th and early 20th centuries. In popular thought, some family lore, and literary fiction, some family names have been perceived as having been shortened by immigration officials for ease of pronunciation or record-keeping, or lack of understanding of the true name—even though name changes were made by the immigrants themselves at other times.  Among the family names that are perceived as being Ellis Island Specials are some that were supposedly more identifiably Jewish, resulting in last names that were not identifiably so. Also, Germanic- and Yiddish-derived names originally spelled with an Eszett (spoken with an s sound but written  ß) have been ascribed to family names like Straub (given the similarity with the letter B), which might have been said originally as Strauss in the Old World.

The phrase "Ellis Island Special" has also been adopted by some food vendors and applied to sandwiches, among other foods.

References

Ellis Island
History of immigration to the United States
Jews and Judaism in New York City